The Jaunsari are a small community found in Uttarakhand, northern India, more specifically in the Jaunsar-Bawar region of the western portion of the state in Garhwal Division. They speak the Jaunsari language which is an Indo-Aryan language.

Jaunsari is a generic term for many communities.

Culture
Jaunsari community reveres  ‘Mahasu Devta’ which is principal deity of Jaunsari community.
Dance and music are integral part of Jaunsari culture. During festivals both men and women dance under the intoxication of the folk music. Local people perform folk dances such as Barada Nati, Harul  and Raso. Fair like Magh Mela and Bissu held which mark the harvesting period.

References

Scheduled Tribes of Uttarakhand